Woolite is an American brand of laundry detergent and cleaning products owned by the British multinational company Reckitt. The company acquired the Woolite brand when it bought Boyle-Midway from American Home Products / Wyeth in 1990. The company manufactures laundry accessories, among other consumer goods.

Bissell Inc., under license from Reckitt Benckiser, manufactures Woolite carpet cleaner, which Bissell had bought from Playtex in 2004.

Products
Woolite Everyday
Woolite Gentle Cycle
Woolite Darks
Woolite Delicates
Woolite Baby
Woolite with EverCare

Ingredients
Water	
Alkylbenzene sulfonic acid
C12-16 alcohols ethoxylated 7EO
Sodium laureth sulfate
Sodium hydroxide
Coconut acid	
Triethanolamine
Tetrasodium glutamate diacetate
Sodium chloride
Proprietary inert filler	
Sodium formate
Fragrance 
Butylated hydroxytoluene
Benzisothiazolinone
Methylisothiazolinone

References

External links
Official website

Laundry detergents
Cleaning product brands
Reckitt brands
S. C. Johnson & Son brands